This is a list of animals listed as endangered under the terms of Queensland's Nature Conservation Act 1992. The list is based on the most recent regulations, the Nature Conservation (Animals) Regulation 2020.

Invertebrates

 Adclarkia dawsonensis (boggomoss snail)
 Adclarkia dulacca (Dulacca woodland snail)
 Argyreus hyperbius inconstans (Australian fritillary butterfly)
 Euastacus eungella (Eungella spiny crayfish)
 Euastacus hystricosus (Conondale spiny crayfish)
 Euastacus monteithorum (Monteith’s spiny crayfish)
 Euastacus robertsi (Robert’s crayfish)
 Tenuibranchiurus glypticus (swamp crayfish)
 Trisyntopa scatophaga (antbed moth)

Fish
 Carcharias taurus (greynurse shark)
Chlamydogobius micropterus (Elizabeth Springs goby)
Chlamydogobius squamigenus (Edgbaston goby)
Hippocampus whitei (White’s seahorse)
Scaturiginichthys vermeilipinnis (redfin blue eye)

Amphibians
 Litoria nannotis (torrent treefrog)
Litoria rheocola (common mist frog)
Mixophyes fleayi (Fleay’s barred frog)
Philoria kundagungan (mountain frog)
Rheobatrachus vitellinus (northern gastric brooding frog)
Taudactylus eungellensis (Eungella tinkerfrog)
Taudactylus rheophilus (northern tinkerfrog)

Reptiles

 Anomalopus mackayi (long-legged worm skink)
 Caretta caretta (loggerhead turtle)
 Concinnia frerei (Bartle Frere bar-sided skink)
 Dermochelys coriacea (leatherback turtle)
 Elusor macrurus (Mary River turtle)
 Eretmochelys imbricata (hawksbill turtle)
 Hemiaspis damelii (grey snake)
 Karma tryoni (Tryon’s skink)
 Lepidochelys olivacea (olive ridley turtle
 Lerista allanae (retro slider)
 Tympanocryptis condaminensis (Condamine earless dragon)
 Tympanocryptis wilsoni (Roma earless dragon)

Birds

 Amytornis barbatus barbatus (grey grasswren (Bulloo))
 Amytornis dorotheae (Carpentarian grasswren)
 Botaurus poiciloptilus (Australasian bittern)
 Calidris canutus (red knot)
 Casuarius casuarius johnsonii (southern cassowary (southern population))
 Charadrius mongolus (lesser sand plover)
 Cyclopsitta diophthalma coxeni (Coxen’s fig-parrot)
 Dasyornis brachypterus (eastern bristlebird)
 Epthianura crocea macgregori (yellow chat (Dawson))
 Erythrotriorchis radiatus (red goshawk)
 Erythrura gouldiae (Gouldian finch)
 Lathamus discolor (swift parrot)
 Limosa lapponica menzbieri (Northern Siberian bar-tailed godwit)
 Macronectes giganteus (southern giant-petrel)
 Neochmia phaeton evangelinae (crimson finch (white-bellied subspecies))
 Neochmia ruficauda ruficauda (star finch (eastern subspecies))
 Numenius madagascariensis (eastern curlew)
 Pezoporus occidentalis (night parrot)
 Poephila cincta cincta (black-throated finch (white-rumped subspecies))
 Psephotus chrysopterygius (golden-shouldered parrot)
 Rostratula australis (Australian painted snipe)
 Sternula nereis exsul (New Caledonian fairy tern)
 Thalassarche cauta (shy albatross)
 Thalassarche chrysostoma (grey-headed albatross)
 Turnix olivii (buff-breasted button-quail)

Mammals

 Antechinus argentus (silver-headed antechinus)
 Antechinus arktos (black-tailed antechinus)
 Bettongia tropica (northern bettong)
 Dasyurus maculatus gracilis (spotted-tailed quoll (northern subspecies))
 Dasyurus maculatus maculatus (spotted-tailed quoll (south-eastern mainland population))
 Hipposideros semoni (Semon’s leaf-nosed bat)
 Macroderma gigas (ghost bat)
 Macrotis lagotis (greater bilby)
 Notomys fuscus (dusky hopping-mouse)
 Onychogalea fraenata (bridled nailtail wallaby)
 Petaurus australis unnamed subsp. (yellow-bellied glider (northern subspecies))
 Petaurus gracilis (mahogany glider)
 Petrogale persephone (Proserpine rock-wallaby)
 Pseudomys australis (plains rat)
 Pseudomys oralis (Hastings River mouse)
 Pteropus conspicillatus (spectacled flying-fox)
 Rhinolophus philippinensis (greater large-eared horseshoe bat)
 Saccolaimus saccolaimus nudicluniatus (bare-rumped sheathtail bat)
 Sminthopsis douglasi (Julia Creek dunnart)

References

 
 (Schedule 1, Part 2, Division 4)

External links

 
Lists of endangered species
 
Lists of animals of Australia
Endangered fauna
Environment of Queensland